Javakheti Protected Areas is located in Akhalkalaki and Ninotsminda municipalities in Samtskhe-Javakheti region, Georgia. It includes Javakheti National Park, Kartsakhi Managed Reserve, Sulda Managed Reserve, Khanchali Managed Reserve, Bugdasheni Managed Reserve and Madatapa Managed Reserve. It was established in 2011. It includes Lake Paravani and Mount Great Abuli.

References 

Geography of Samtskhe–Javakheti